Pierre Vogel (born July 20, 1978), also known as Abu Hamza is a German Islamist preacher and a former professional boxer.

Early life and boxing career
Vogel was born in Frechen. He turned professional at the age of 22, fighting briefly (for two years) as a cruiserweight for the Sauerland club and was undefeated in seven bouts.

Religion

Vogel converted to Islam in 2001 and shortly thereafter began courses in Islamic studies in Germany, and then studied in Medina.

He is considered to be one of the most influential Islamists in Germany.

Private life
Vogel is married to a Muslim Moroccan woman and father of three children.

Media perception
He has been described in one German report as a "radical Muslim", while Matthias Matussek, author and commentator for Spiegel Online, described him as representative of the "dark Nazi variant" of Islam in Germany.

When he appeared at a Muslim meeting in Dillingen, Saarland, 25 April 2010, he said that polygamy is legitimate due to the fact that there are more women than men in Germany.

In January 2016, Vogel shared a video giving out the personal details of a woman who claimed to have been raped by men of Middle Eastern appearance in Cologne, claiming that she had falsified her story in order to slander Islam. The video's creator deleted it after a legal challenge from the victim.

References

External links

  (Pierre Vogels current website)
 einladungzumparadies.de (Pierre Vogel's former website)
 diewahrereligion.de: Pierre Vogel (Pierre Vogel's former website)
 
 Eine Reportage über dem Ex-Profi Boxer Pierre Vogel, der zum Islam konvertiert ist, aus dem 2. kroatischen Staatsfernsehen (mit kroatischen Untertiteln) HRT 2

Converts to Islam from Protestantism
1978 births
Living people
People from Frechen
Sportspeople from Cologne (region)
German male boxers
German Islamists
German Salafis
Cruiserweight boxers